Poecilocapsus is a genus of bugs in the family Miridae.

Species
The following species are recognised in the genus Poecilocapsus:

Poecilocapsus alacer 
Poecilocapsus citrinus 
Poecilocapsus fremontii 
Poecilocapsus lineatus 
Poecilocapsus mollis 
Poecilocapsus nigriger 
Poecilocapsus ornatulus 
Poecilocapsus ostentus 
Poecilocapsus tabidus 
Poecilocapsus veterandus 
Poecilocapsus veternosus

References

Miridae genera
Mirini